Joanne Hunter  (born 27 May 1991) is an English field hockey player who plays as a forward for Buckingham and the  England and Great Britain national teams.

In 2017 she married England hockey goalkeeper George Pinner.

Club career

Hunter plays club hockey in the Women's England Hockey League Premier Division for Buckingham.

She has also played for Surbiton, Beeston, Leicester and Aylesbury HC.

International career
Hunter mader her senior international debut for England against South Africa on 4 Feb 2013.

References

External links
 Jo Hunter at England Hockey
 Jo Hunter at Great Britain Hockey
 
 
 

1991 births
Living people
English female field hockey players
Female field hockey forwards
Beeston Hockey Club players
Surbiton Hockey Club players
Women's England Hockey League players
Commonwealth Games medallists in field hockey
Commonwealth Games bronze medallists for England
Field hockey players at the 2018 Commonwealth Games
Sportspeople from Aylesbury
Medallists at the 2018 Commonwealth Games